Anastasia Sergeyevna Voynova (born 5 February 1993) is a Russian professional track cyclist. She won the bronze medal in the 500 m time trial event at the 2014 UCI Track Cycling World Championships. At the 2015 UCI Track Cycling World Championships, she won a silver medal in the team sprint and a gold in the 500 m time trial. At the 2015 UEC European Track Championships, Voinova broke the 500 m time trial world record in 32.794 seconds.

Major results

2010
3rd Team Sprint, UEC European U23 Track Championships (with Victoria Baranova)
2012
UEC European U23 Track Championships
1st  Team Sprint (with Victoria Baranova)
1st  500m Time Trial
2013
UEC European U23 Track Championships
1st  Sprint
2nd Team Sprint (with Ekaterina Gnidenko)
Grand Prix of Russian Helicopters
2nd Sprint
2nd Team Sprint (with Daria Shmeleva)
2014
UEC European Track Championships
1st  Sprint
1st  Team Sprint (with Elena Brejniva and Daria Shmeleva)
1st  500m Time Trial
Grand Prix of Tula
1st Team Sprint (with Ekaterina Gnidenko)
1st 500m Time Trial
2nd Sprint
Memorial of Alexander Lesnikov
1st Team Sprint (with Daria Shmeleva)
2nd Sprint
500m Time Trial
1st Sprint, Cottbuser SprintCup
1st Team Sprint GP von Deutschland im Sprint (with Daria Shmeleva)
UEC European U23 Track Championships
1st  Sprint
1st  Team Sprint (with Daria Shmeleva)
1st  500m Time Trial
2015
UEC European Track Championships
1st  Team Sprint (with Daria Shmeleva)
1st  500m Time Trial
2nd Sprint
Grand Prix of Tula
1st Keirin
1st Sprint
1st Team Sprint (with Daria Shmeleva)
Memorial of Alexander Lesnikov
1st Keirin
1st Sprint
1st Team Sprint (with Daria Shmeleva)
Cottbuser SprintCup
1st 500m Time Trial
3rd Sprint
UEC European U23 Track Championships
1st  Sprint
1st  Team Sprint (with Daria Shmeleva)
1st  500m Time Trial
GP von Deutschland im Sprint
2nd Sprint
2nd Team Sprint (with Daria Shmeleva)
2016
UCI World Track Championships
1st  Team Sprint (with Daria Shmeleva)
1st  500m Time Trial
Memorial of Alexander Lesnikov
1st Team Sprint (with Daria Shmeleva)
2nd Sprint
Grand Prix of Tula
1st Team Sprint (with Daria Shmeleva)
2nd Keirin
3rd Sprint
Grand Prix Minsk
1st 500m Time Trial
2nd Sprint
3rd Keirin
Panevežys
2nd Keirin
3rd Sprint
2017
UCI World Track Championships
1st  Team Sprint (with Daria Shmeleva)
3rd 500m Time Trial
1st  UEC European Track Championships (with Daria Shmeleva)
1st Sprint, Grand Prix of Moscow
2nd Sprint, GP von Deutschland im Sprint

References

External links

1993 births
Living people
Russian female cyclists
Sportspeople from Tula, Russia
Cyclists at the 2016 Summer Olympics
Cyclists at the 2020 Summer Olympics
Olympic cyclists of Russia
Medalists at the 2016 Summer Olympics
Medalists at the 2020 Summer Olympics
Olympic silver medalists for Russia
Olympic bronze medalists for the Russian Olympic Committee athletes
Olympic medalists in cycling
UCI Track Cycling World Champions (women)
Russian track cyclists
European Championships (multi-sport event) gold medalists
Cyclists at the 2019 European Games
European Games medalists in cycling
European Games gold medalists for Russia